The 1971–72 Indiana Hoosiers men's basketball team represented Indiana University. Their head coach was Bobby Knight, who was in his 1st year. The team played its home games in the newly constructed Assembly Hall in Bloomington, Indiana, and was a member of the Big Ten Conference.

The Hoosiers finished the regular season with an overall record of 17–8 and a conference record of 9–5, finishing 3rd in the Big Ten Conference. Missing out on the NCAA Tournament, Indiana was invited to play in the National Invitation Tournament; however, the Hoosiers lost in the first round, bringing Knight's first season to an end.

Roster

Schedule/Results

|-
!colspan=8| Regular Season
|-

|-
!colspan=8| NIT

Rankings

Team players drafted into the NBA

References

Indiana Hoosiers
Indiana Hoosiers men's basketball seasons
Indiana
Indiana Hoosiers
Indiana Hoosiers